The Navajos (British English: Navaho;  or ) are a Native American people of the Southwestern United States.

With more than 399,494 enrolled tribal members , the Navajo Nation is the largest federally recognized tribe in the United States; additionally, the Navajo Nation has the largest reservation in the country. The reservation straddles the Four Corners region and covers more than 27,325 square miles (70,000 square km) of land in Arizona, Utah, and New Mexico. The Navajo Reservation is slightly larger than the state of West Virginia. The Navajo language is spoken throughout the region, and most Navajos also speak English.

The states with the largest Navajo populations are Arizona (140,263) and New Mexico (108,306). More than three-fourths of the enrolled Navajo population resides in these two states.

Besides the Navajo Nation proper, a small group of Navajos are members of the federally recognized Colorado River Indian Tribes.

History

Early history

The Navajos are speakers of a Na-Dené Southern Athabaskan language which they call Diné bizaad (lit. 'People's language'). Although they referred to themselves as the Diné, meaning (the) people.   The language comprises two geographic, mutually intelligible dialects. The Apache language is closely related to the Navajo Language; the Navajos and Apaches migrated from northwestern Canada and eastern Alaska, where the majority of Athabaskan speakers reside. Speakers of various other Athabaskan languages located in Canada may still comprehend the Navajo language despite the geographic and linguistic deviation of the languages. Additionally, some Navajos speak Navajo Sign Language, which is either a dialect or daughter of Plains Sign Talk. Some also speak Plains Sign Talk itself.

Archaeological and historical evidence suggests the Athabaskan ancestors of the Navajos and Apaches invaded the Southwest around 1400 AD. The Navajo oral tradition is transcribed to retain references to this migration.

Initially, the Navajos were largely hunters and gatherers. Later, they learned farming from Pueblo peoples, growing mainly the Pueblos' traditional "Three Sisters" of corn, beans, and squash. They adopted herding sheep and goats from the Spaniards as a main source of trade and food. Meat became essential in the Navajo diet. Sheep became a form of currency and family status. Women began to spin and weave wool into blankets and clothing after learning this from "Weaving Woman" from Zia Pueblo; they created items of highly valued artistic expression, which were also traded and sold.

Oral history indicates a fraught relationship with Pueblo people and a willingness to incorporate Puebloan ideas which is still challenged as having been nonconsensual per Pueblo oral histories and linguistic variance. There were long-established trading practices between the groups and ongoing conflict that led to Pueblo people closing many traditions, altering ceremonial timing to avoid Navajo raids, and restricting access to information regarding traditional practices and imagery. These challenges continue in modern times, including Navajo appropriation of Pueblo imagery and cultural meaning for the Nike subdivision, N7. Mid-16th century Spanish records recount that the Pueblo traded maize and woven cotton goods for bison meat, hides, and stone from Athabaskans migrating around the Pueblos or settling nearby. In the 18th century, the Spanish reported that the Navajos maintained large herds of livestock and cultivated large crop areas.

Western historians believe that the Spanish before 1600 referred to the Navajos as Apaches or Quechos. Fray Geronimo de Zarate-Salmeron, who was in Jemez in 1622, used Apachu de Nabajo in the 1620s to refer to the people in the Chama Valley region, east of the San Juan River and northwest of present-day Santa Fe, New Mexico. It is unclear from Navajo sources when they became more distinct from their Apache relatives. Navahu comes from the Tewa language. By the 1640s, the Spanish began using the term Navajo to refer to the Diné.

In the 1770s, the Spanish sent military expeditions against the Navajos in the Mount Taylor and Chuska Mountain regions of New Mexico. The Spanish, Navajos and Hopis (who are a Pueblo people) continued to trade with each other and formed a loose alliance, that changed often, to occasionally fight Apache and Comanche bands for the next 20 years. During this time there were relatively minor raids by Navajo bands and Spanish citizens against each other.

In 1800, Governor Fernando Chacón led 500 men to the Tunicha Mountains against the Navajo. Twenty Navajo chiefs asked for peace. In 1804 and 1805, the Navajo and Spaniards mounted major expeditions against each-other's settlements. In May 1805, another peace was established. Similar patterns of peace-making, raiding, and trading among the Navajo, Spaniards, Apache, Comanche, Hopi, Pueblo people continued until the arrival of Americans in 1846.

Territory of New Mexico 1846–1863
The Navajos encountered the United States Army in 1846, when General Stephen W. Kearny invaded Santa Fe with 1,600 men during the Mexican–American War. On November 21, 1846, following an invitation from a small party of American soldiers under the command of Captain John Reid, who journeyed deep into Navajo country and contacted him, Narbona and other Navajos negotiated a treaty of peace with Colonel Alexander Doniphan at Bear Springs, Ojo del Oso (later the site of Fort Wingate). This agreement was not honored by some Navajo, nor by some New Mexicans. The Navajos raided New Mexican livestock, New Mexicans took women, children, and livestock from the Navajo.

In 1849, the military governor of New Mexico, Colonel John MacRae Washington—accompanied by John S. Calhoun, an Indian agent—led 400 soldiers into Navajo country, penetrating Canyon de Chelly. He signed a treaty with two Navajo leaders: Mariano Martinez as Head Chief and Chapitone as Second Chief. The treaty acknowledged the transfer of jurisdiction from the United Mexican States to the United States. The treaty allowed forts and trading posts to be built on Navajo land. In exchange, the United States, promised "such donations [and] such other liberal and humane measures, as [it] may deem meet and proper." While en route to sign this treaty, the prominent Navajo peace leader Narbona, was killed, causing hostility between the treaty parties.

During the next 10 years, the U.S. established forts on traditional Navajo territory. Military records cite this development as a precautionary measure to protect citizens and the Navajos from each other. However, the Spanish/Mexican-Navajo pattern of raids and expeditions continued. Over 400 New Mexican militia conducted a campaign against the Navajo, against the wishes of the Territorial Governor, in 1860–61. They killed Navajo warriors, captured women and children for slaves, and destroyed crops and dwellings. The Navajos call this period Naahondzood, "the fearing time."

In 1861, Brigadier-General James H. Carleton, Commander of the Federal District of New Mexico, initiated a series of military actions against the Navajos and Apaches. Colonel Kit Carson  was at the new Fort Wingate with Army troops and volunteer New Mexico militia. Carleton ordered Carson to kill Mescalero Apache men and destroy any Mescalero property he could find. Carleton believed these harsh tactics would bring any Indian Tribe under control. The Mescalero surrendered and were sent to the new reservation called Bosque Redondo.

In 1863, Carleton ordered Carson to use the same tactics on the Navajo. Carson and his force swept through Navajo land, killing Navajos and destroying crops and dwellings, fouling wells, and capturing livestock. Facing starvation and death, Navajo groups came in to Fort Defiance for relief. On July 20, 1863, the first of many groups departed to join the Mescalero at Bosque Redondo. Other groups continued to come in though 1864.

However, not all the Navajos came in or were found. Some lived near the San Juan River, some beyond the Hopi villages, and others lived with Apache bands.

Long Walk

The internment was disastrous for the Navajo, as the government failed to provide enough water, wood, provisions, and livestock for the 4,000 to 5,000 people. Large-scale crop failure and disease were also endemic during this time, as were raids by other tribes and white civilians. Some Navajos froze in the winter because they could make only poor shelters from the few materials they were given. This period is known among the Navajos as "The Fearing Time". In addition, a small group of Mescalero Apache, longtime enemies of the Navajos had been relocated to the area, which resulted in conflicts.

In 1868, the Treaty of Bosque Redondo was negotiated between Navajo leaders and the federal government allowing the surviving Navajos to return to a reservation on a portion of their former homeland.

Reservation era

The United States military continued to maintain forts on the Navajo reservation in the years after the Long Walk. From 1873 to 1895, the military employed Navajos as "Indian Scouts" at Fort Wingate to help their regular units. During this period, Chief Manuelito founded the Navajo Tribal Police. It operated from 1872 to 1875 as an anti-raid task force working to maintain the peaceful terms of the 1868 Navajo treaty.

By treaty, the Navajos were allowed to leave the reservation for trade, with permission from the military or local Indian agent. Eventually, the arrangement led to a gradual end in Navajo raids, as the tribe was able to increase their livestock and crops. But economic conflicts with non-Navajos continued for many years as civilians and companies exploited resources assigned to the Navajo. The US government made leases for livestock grazing, took land for railroad development, and permitted mining on Navajo land without consulting the tribe.

In 1883, Lt. Parker, accompanied by 10 enlisted men and two scouts, went up the San Juan River to separate the Navajos and citizens who had encroached on Navajo land. In the same year, Lt. Lockett, with the aid of 42 enlisted soldiers, was joined by Lt. Holomon at Navajo Springs. Evidently, citizens of the surnames Houck and/or Owens had murdered a Navajo chief's son, and 100 armed Navajo warriors were looking for them.

In 1887, citizens Palmer, Lockhart, and King fabricated a charge of horse stealing and randomly attacked a dwelling on the reservation. Two Navajo men and all three whites died as a result, but a woman and a child survived. Capt. Kerr (with two Navajo scouts) examined the ground and then met with several hundred Navajos at Houcks Tank. Rancher Bennett, whose horse was allegedly stolen, told Kerr that his horses were stolen by the three whites to catch a horse thief. In the same year, Lt. Scott went to the San Juan River with two scouts and 21 enlisted men. The Navajos believed Scott was there to drive off the whites who had settled on the reservation and had fenced off the river from the Navajo. Scott found evidence of many non-Navajo ranches. Only three were active, and the owners wanted payment for their improvements before leaving. Scott ejected them.

In 1890, a local rancher refused to pay the Navajos a fine of livestock. The Navajos tried to collect it, and whites in southern Colorado and Utah claimed that 9,000 of the Navajos were on a warpath. A small military detachment out of Fort Wingate restored white citizens to order.

In 1913, an Indian agent ordered a Navajo and his three wives to come in, and then arrested them for having a plural marriage. A small group of Navajos used force to free the women and retreated to Beautiful Mountain with 30 or 40 sympathizers. They refused to surrender to the agent, and local law enforcement and military refused the agent's request for an armed engagement. General Scott arrived, and with the help of Henry Chee Dodge, a leader among the Navajo, defused the situation.

Boarding schools and education

During the time on the reservation, the Navajo tribe was forced to assimilate to white society. Navajo children were sent to boarding schools within the reservation and off the reservation. The first Bureau of Indian Affairs (BIA) school opened at Fort Defiance in 1870 and led the way for eight others to be established. Many older Navajos were against this education and would hide their children to keep them from being taken.

Once the children arrived at the boarding school, their lives changed dramatically. European Americans taught the classes under an English-only curriculum and punished any student caught speaking Navajo. The children were under militaristic discipline, run by the Siláo. In multiple interviews, subjects recalled being captured and disciplined by the Siláo if they tried to run away. Other conditions included inadequate food, overcrowding, required manual labor in kitchens, fields, and boiler rooms; and military-style uniforms and haircuts.

Change did not occur in these boarding schools until after the Meriam Report was published in 1929 by the Secretary of Interior, Hubert Work. This report discussed Indian boarding schools as being inadequate in terms of diet, medical services, dormitory overcrowding, undereducated teachers, restrictive discipline, and manual labor by the students to keep the school running.

This report was the precursor to education reforms initiated under President Franklin D. Roosevelt, under which two new schools were built on the Navajo reservation. But Rough Rock Day School was run in the same militaristic style as Fort Defiance and did not implement the educational reforms. The Evangelical Missionary School was opened next to Rough Rock Day School. Navajo accounts of this school portray it as having a family-like atmosphere with home-cooked meals, new or gently used clothing, humane treatment, and a Navajo-based curriculum. Educators found the Evangelical Missionary School curriculum to be much more beneficial for the Navajo children.

In 1937, Boston heiress Mary Cabot Wheelright and Navajo singer and medicine man Hastiin Klah founded the Wheelwright Museum of the American Indian in Santa Fe. It is a repository for sound recordings, manuscripts, paintings, and sandpainting tapestries of the Navajos. It also featured exhibits to express the beauty, dignity, and logic of Navajo religion. When Klah met Cabot in 1921, he had witnessed decades of efforts by the US government and missionaries to assimilate the Navajos into mainstream society. The museum was founded to preserve the religion and traditions of the Navajo, which Klah was sure would otherwise soon be lost forever.

The result of these boarding schools led to much language loss within the Navajo Nation. After the Second World War, the Meriam Report funded more children to attend these schools with six times as many children attending boarding school than before the War. English as the primary language spoken at these schools as well as the local towns surrounding the Navajo reservations contributed to residents becoming bilingual; however Navajo was the still the primary language spoken at home.

Livestock Reduction 1930s–1950s

The Navajo Livestock Reduction was imposed upon the Navajo Nation by the federal government starting in the 1933, during the Great Depression. Under various forms it continued into the 1950s. Worried about large herds in the arid climate, at a time when the Dust Bowl was endangering the Great Plains, the government decided that the land of the Navajo Nation could support only a fixed number of sheep, goats, cattle, and horses. The Federal government believed that land erosion was worsening in the area and the only solution was to reduce the number of livestock.

In 1933, John Collier was appointed commissioner of the BIA. In many ways, he worked to reform government relations with the Native American tribes, but the reduction program was devastating for the Navajo, for whom their livestock was so important. The government set land capacity in terms of "sheep units". In 1930 the Navajos grazed 1,100,000 mature sheep units. These sheep provided half the cash income for the individual Navajo.

Collier's solution was to first launch a voluntary reduction program, which was made mandatory two years later in 1935. The government paid for part of the value of each animal, but it did nothing to compensate for the loss of future yearly income for so many Navajo. In the matrilineal and matrilocal world of the Navajo, women were especially hurt, as many lost their only source of income with the reduction of livestock herds.

The Navajos did not understand why their centuries-old practices of raising livestock should change. They were united in opposition but they were unable to stop it. Historian Brian Dippie notes that the Indian Rights Association denounced Collier as a 'dictator' and accused him of a "near reign of terror" on the Navajo reservation. Dippie adds that, "He became an object of 'burning hatred' among the very people whose problems so preoccupied him."  The long-term result was strong Navajo opposition to Collier's Indian New Deal.

Navajo Code Talkers in World War II

Many Navajo young people moved to cities to work in urban factories in World War II. Many Navajo men volunteered for military service in keeping with their warrior culture, and they served in integrated units. The War Department in 1940 rejected a proposal by the BIA that segregated units be created for the Indians. The Navajos gained firsthand experience with how they could assimilate into the modern world, and many did not return to the overcrowded reservation, which had few jobs.

Four hundred Navajo code talkers played a famous role during World War II by relaying radio messages using their own language. The Japanese were unable to understand or decode it.

In the 1940s, large quantities of uranium were discovered in Navajo land. From then into the early 21st century, the U.S. allowed mining without sufficient environmental protection for workers, waterways, and land. The Navajos have claimed high rates of death and illness from lung disease and cancer resulting from environmental contamination. Since the 1970s, legislation has helped to regulate the industry and reduce the toll, but the government has not yet offered holistic and comprehensive compensation.

U.S. Marine Corps Involvement
The Navajo Code Talkers played a significant role in USMC history. Using their own language they utilized a military code; for example, the Navajo word "turtle" represented a tank. In 1942, Marine staff officers composed several combat simulations and the Navajo translated it and transmitted it in their dialect to another Navajo on the other line. This Navajo then translated it back in English faster than any other cryptographic facilities, which demonstrated their efficacy. As a result, General Vogel recommended their recruitment into the USMC code talker program.

Each Navajo went through basic bootcamp at Marine Corps Recruit Depot, San Diego before being assigned to Field Signal Battalion training at Camp Pendleton. Once the code talkers completed training in the States, they were sent to the Pacific for assignment to the Marine combat divisions. With that said, there was never a crack in the Navajo language, it was never deciphered. It is known that many more Navajos volunteered to become code talkers than could be accepted; however, an undetermined number of other Navajos served as Marines in the war, but not as code talkers.

These achievements of the Navajo Code Talkers have resulted in an honorable chapter in USMC history. Their patriotism and honor inevitably earned them the respect of all Americans.

After 1945

Culture

The name "Navajo" comes from the late 18th century via the Spanish (Apaches de) Navajó "(Apaches of) Navajó", which was derived from the Tewa navahū "farm fields adjoining a valley". The Navajos call themselves . 

Like other Apacheans, the Navajos were semi-nomadic from the 16th through the 20th centuries. Their extended kinship groups had seasonal dwelling areas to accommodate livestock, agriculture, and gathering practices. As part of their traditional economy, Navajo groups may have formed trading or raiding parties, traveling relatively long distances.

There is a system of clans which defines relationships between individuals and families. The clan system is exogamous: people can only marry (and date) partners outside their own clans, which for this purpose include the clans of their four grandparents. Some Navajos favor their
children to marry into their father's clan. While clans are associated with a geographical area, the area is not for the exclusive use of any one clan. Members of a clan may live hundreds of miles apart but still have a clan bond.

Historically, the structure of the Navajo society is largely a matrilineal system, in which the family of the women owned livestock, dwellings, planting areas and livestock grazing areas. Once married, a Navajo man would follow a matrilocal residence and live with his bride in her dwelling and near her mother's family. Daughters (or, if necessary, other female relatives) were traditionally the ones who received the generational property inheritance. In cases of marital separation, women would maintain the property and children. Children are "born to" and belong to the mother's clan, and are "born for" the father's clan. The mother's eldest brother has a strong role in her children's lives. As adults, men represent their mother's clan in tribal politics. 

Neither sex can live without the other in the Navajo culture. Men and women are seen as contemporary equals as both a male and female are needed to reproduce. Although women may carry a bigger burden, fertility is so highly valued that males are expected to provide economic resources (known as bride wealth). Corn is a symbol of fertility in Navajo culture as they eat white corn in the wedding ceremonies. It is considered to be immoral and/or stealing if one does not provide for the other in that premarital or marital relationship.

Ethnobotany
See Navajo ethnobotany.

Traditional dwellings

A hogan, the traditional Navajo home, is built as a shelter for either a man or for a woman. Male hogans are square or conical with a distinct rectangular entrance, while a female hogan is an eight-sided house. Hogans are made of logs and covered in mud, with the door always facing east to welcome the sun each morning. Navajos also have several types of hogans for lodging and ceremonial use. Ceremonies, such as healing ceremonies or the kinaaldá, take place inside a hogan. According to Kehoe, this style of housing is distinctive to the Navajos. She writes, "even today, a solidly constructed, log-walled Hogan is preferred by many Navajo families." Most Navajo members today live in apartments and houses in urban areas.

Those who practice the Navajo religion regard the hogan as sacred. The religious song "The Blessingway" describes the first hogan as being built by Coyote with help from Beavers to be a house for First Man, First Woman, and Talking God. The Beaver People gave Coyote logs and instructions on how to build the first hogan. Navajos made their hogans in the traditional fashion until the 1900s, when they started to make them in hexagonal and octagonal shapes. Hogans continue to be used as dwellings, especially by older Navajos, although they tend to be made with modern construction materials and techniques. Some are maintained specifically for ceremonial purposes.

Spiritual and religious beliefs

Navajo spiritual practice is about restoring balance and harmony to a person's life to produce health and is based on the ideas of Hózhóójí. The Diné believed in two classes of people: Earth People and Holy People. The Navajo people believe they passed through three worlds before arriving in this world, the Fourth World or the Glittering World. As Earth People, the Diné must do everything within their power to maintain the balance between Mother Earth and man. The Diné also had the expectation of keeping a positive relationship between them and the Diyin Diné. In the Diné Bahaneʼ (Navajo beliefs about creation), the First, or Dark World is where the four Diyin Diné lived and where First Woman and First Man came into existence. Because the world was so dark, life could not thrive there and they had to move on. The Second, or Blue World, was inhabited by a few of the mammals Earth People know today as well as the Swallow Chief, or Táshchózhii. The First World beings had offended him and were asked to leave. From there, they headed south and arrived in the Third World, or Yellow World. The four sacred mountains were found here, but due to a great flood, First Woman, First Man, and the Holy People were forced to find another world to live in. This time, when they arrived, they stayed in the Fourth World. In the Glittering World, true death came into existence, as well as the creations of the seasons, the moon, stars, and the sun.

The Holy People, or Diyin Diné, had instructed the Earth People to view the four sacred mountains as the boundaries of the homeland they should never leave: Blanca Peak ( — Dawn or White Shell Mountain) in Colorado; Mount Taylor ( — Blue Bead or Turquoise Mountain) in New Mexico; the San Francisco Peaks ( — Abalone Shell Mountain) in Arizona; and Hesperus Mountain ( — Big Mountain Sheep) in Colorado. Times of day, as well as colors, are used to represent the four sacred mountains. Throughout religions, the importance of a specific number is emphasized and in the Navajo religion, the number four appears to be sacred to their practices. For example, there were four original clans of Diné, four colors and times of day, four Diyin Diné, and for the most part, four songs sung for a ritual.

Navajos have many different ceremonies. For the most part, their ceremonies are to prevent or cure diseases. Corn pollen is used as a blessing and as an offering during prayer. One half of major Navajo song ceremonial complex is the Blessing Way (Hózhǫ́ǫ́jí) and other half is the Enemy Way (Anaʼí Ndááʼ). The Blessing Way ceremonies are based on establishing "peace, harmony, and good things exclusively" within the Dine. The Enemy Way, or Evil Way ceremonies are concerned with counteracting influences that come from outside the Dine. Spiritual healing ceremonies are rooted in Navajo traditional stories. One of them, the Night Chant ceremony, is conducted over several days and involves up to 24 dancers. The ceremony requires the dancers to wear buckskin masks, as do many of the other Navajo ceremonies, and they all represent specific gods. The purpose of the Night Chant is to purify the patients and heal them through prayers to the spirit-beings. Each day of the ceremony entails the performance of certain rites and the creation of detailed sand paintings. One of the songs describes the home of the thunderbirds:

In Tsegihi [White House],
In the house made of the dawn,
In the house made of the evening light

The ceremonial leader proceeds by asking the Holy People to be present at the beginning of the ceremony, then identifying the patient with the power of the spirit-being, and describing the patient's transformation to renewed health with lines such as, "Happily I recover."

Ceremonies are used to correct curses that cause some illnesses or misfortunes. People may complain of witches who do harm to the minds, bodies, and families of innocent people, though these matters are rarely discussed in detail with those outside of the community.<ref name=Keene>Keene, Dr. Adrienne, "Magic in North America Part 1: Ugh." at Native Appropriations", 8 March 2016. Accessed 9 April 2016: "What happens when Rowling pulls this in, is we as Native people are now opened up to a barrage of questions about these beliefs and traditions ... but these are not things that need or should be discussed by outsiders. At all. I'm sorry if that seems "unfair," but that's how our cultures survive."</ref>

 Oral stories/Works of literature See: Diné Bahaneʼ (Creation Story) and Black God and Coyote (notable traditional characters)The Navajo Tribe relied on oral tradition to maintain beliefs and stories. Examples would include the traditional creation story Diné Bahaneʼ. There are also some Navajo Indian legends that are staples in literature, including The First Man and First Woman  as well as The Sun, Moon and Stars. The First Man and Woman is the story about the creation of the world, and The Sun, Moon and Stars is the story about the origin of heavenly bodies.

Music

Visual arts

Silverwork

Silversmithing is an important art form among Navajos. Atsidi Sani (c. 1830–c. 1918) is considered to be the first Navajo silversmith. He learned silversmithing from a Mexican man called Nakai Tsosi ("Thin Mexican") around 1878 and began teaching other Navajos how to work with silver. By 1880, Navajo silversmiths were creating handmade jewelry including bracelets, tobacco flasks, necklaces and bracers. Later, they added silver earrings, buckles, bolos, hair ornaments, pins and squash blossom necklaces for tribal use, and to sell to tourists as a way to supplement their income.

The Navajos' hallmark jewelry piece called the "squash blossom" necklace first appeared in the 1880s. The term "squash blossom" was apparently attached to the name of the Navajo necklace at an early date, although its bud-shaped beads are thought to derive from Spanish-Mexican pomegranate designs. The Navajo silversmiths also borrowed the "naja" (najahe in Navajo) symbol to shape the silver pendant that hangs from the "squash blossom" necklace.

Turquoise has been part of jewelry for centuries, but Navajo artists did not use inlay techniques to insert turquoise into silver designs until the late 19th century.

Weaving

Navajos came to the southwest with their own weaving traditions; however, they learned to weave cotton on vertical looms from Pueblo peoples. The first Spaniards to visit the region wrote about seeing Navajo blankets. By the 18th century, the Navajos had begun to import Bayeta red yarn to supplement local black, grey, and white wool, as well as wool dyed with indigo. Using an upright loom, the Navajos made extremely fine utilitarian blankets that were collected by Ute and Plains Indians. These Chief's Blankets, so called because only chiefs or very wealthy individuals could afford them, were characterized by horizontal stripes and minimal patterning in red. First Phase Chief's Blankets have only horizontal stripes, Second Phase feature red rectangular designs, and Third Phase features red diamonds and partial diamond patterns.

The completion of the railroads dramatically changed Navajo weaving. Cheap blankets were imported, so Navajo weavers shifted their focus to weaving rugs for an increasingly non-Native audience. Rail service also brought in Germantown wool from Philadelphia, commercially dyed wool which greatly expanded the weavers' color palettes.

Some early European-American settlers moved in and set up trading posts, often buying Navajo rugs by the pound and selling them back east by the bale. The traders encouraged the locals to weave blankets and rugs into distinct styles. These included "Two Gray Hills" (predominantly black and white, with traditional patterns); Teec Nos Pos (colorful, with very extensive patterns); "Ganado" (founded by Don Lorenzo Hubbell), red-dominated patterns with black and white; "Crystal" (founded by J. B. Moore); oriental and Persian styles (almost always with natural dyes); "Wide Ruins", "Chinlee", banded geometric patterns; "Klagetoh", diamond-type patterns; "Red Mesa" and bold diamond patterns. Many of these patterns exhibit a fourfold symmetry, which is thought to embody traditional ideas about harmony or hózhǫ́.

In the media
In 2000 the documentary The Return of Navajo Boy was shown at the Sundance Film Festival. It was written in response to an earlier film, The Navajo Boy which was somewhat exploitative of those Navajos involved. The Return of Navajo Boy allowed the Navajos to be more involved in the depictions of themselves.

In the final episode of the third season of the FX reality TV show 30 Days, the show's producer Morgan Spurlock spends thirty days living with a Navajo family on their reservation in New Mexico. The July 2008 show called "Life on an Indian Reservation", depicts the dire conditions that many Native Americans experience living on reservations in the United States.

Tony Hillerman wrote a series of detective novels whose detective characters were members of the Navajo Tribal Police. The novels are noted for incorporating details about Navajo culture, and in some cases expand the focus to include nearby Hopi and Zuni characters and cultures, as well. Four of the novels have been adapted for film/TV. His daughter has continued the novel series after his death.

In 1997, Welsh author Eirug Wyn published the Welsh-language novel "I Ble'r Aeth Haul y Bore?" ("Where did the Morning Sun go?" in English) which tells the story of Carson's misdoings against the Navajo people from the point of view of a fictional young Navajo woman called "Haul y Bore" ("Morning Sun" in English).

Notable people with Navajo ancestry

 Fred Begay, nuclear physicist and a Korean War veteran
 Notah Begay III (Navajo-Isleta-San Felipe Pueblo), American professional golfer
 Klee Benally, musician and documentary filmmaker
 Nikki Cooley, environmentalist, Grand Canyon river guide
 Jacoby Ellsbury, New York Yankees outfielder (enrolled Colorado River Indian Tribes)
 Rickie Fowler, American professional golfer
 Joe Kieyoomia, captured by the Imperial Japanese Army after the fall of the Philippines in 1942
 Nicco Montaño, former women's UFC flyweight champion
 Chester Nez, the last original Navajo code talker who served in the United States Marine Corps during World War II.
 Krystal Tsosie, geneticist and bioethicist known for promoting Indigenous data sovereignty and studying genetics within Indigenous communities
 Lance Tsosie, TikToker whose videos discuss North American Native culture and history.
 Cory Witherill, first full-blooded Native American in NASCAR
 Aaron Yazzie, mechanical engineer at NASA's Jet Propulsion Laboratory

Artists

 Beatien Yazz (born 1928), painter
Apie Begay (fl. 1902), first Navajo artist to use European drawing materials
Harrison Begay (1914–2012), Studio painter
 Joyce Begay-Foss, weaver, educator, and museum curator
 Mary Holiday Black (born c. 1934), basket maker
 Raven Chacon (born 1977), conceptual artist
 Lorenzo Clayton (born 1940), artist
Carl Nelson Gorman (also known as Kin-Ya-Onny-Beyeh; 1907–1998), painter, printmaker, illustrator, and Navajo code talker with the U.S. Marine Corp during World War II.
 R. C. Gorman (1932–2005), painter and printmaker
 Hastiin Klah, weaver and co-founder of the Wheelwright Museum of the American Indian
 David Johns (born 1948), painter
 Yazzie Johnson, contemporary silversmith
 Betty Manygoats, Táchiiʼnii, contemporary ceramicist
 Christine Nofchissey McHorse (1948-2021), ceramicist
 Gerald Nailor, Sr. (1917–1952), studio painter
 Barbara Teller Ornelas (born 1954), master Navajo weaver, cultural ambassador of the U.S. State Department 
 Atsidi Sani (c. 1828–1918), first known Navajo silversmith
 Clara Nezbah Sherman, weaver
 Ryan Singer, painter, illustrator, screen printer
 Tommy Singer, silversmith and jeweler
 Quincy Tahoma (1920–1956), studio painter
 Klah Tso (mid-19th century — early 20th century), pioneering easel painter
 Emmi Whitehorse, contemporary painter
 Melanie Yazzie, contemporary print maker and educator
 Teresa Montoya, film maker

Performers
Jeremiah Bitsui, actor
Blackfire, punk/alternative rock band
Raven Chacon, composer
Radmilla Cody, traditional singer
James and Ernie, comedy duo
R. Carlos Nakai, musician
Jock Soto, ballet dancer

Politicians
 Christina Haswood, member of the Kansas House of Representatives since 2021.
 Henry Chee Dodge, last Head Chief of the Navajo and first Chairman of the Navajo Tribe, (1922–1928, 1942–1946).
 Peterson Zah, first President of the Navajo Nation and last Chairman of the Navajo Tribe.
Albert Hale, former President of the Navajo Nation. He served in the Arizona Senate from 2004 to 2011 and in the Arizona House of Representatives from 2011 to 2017.
Jonathan Nez, Current President of the Navajo Nation. He served three terms as Navajo Council Delegate representing the chapters of Shonto, Oljato, Tsah Bi Kin and Navajo Mountain. Served two terms as Navajo County Board of Supervisors for District 1.
 Annie Dodge Wauneka, former Navajo Tribal Councilwoman and advocate.
 Thomas Dodge, former Chairman of the Navajo Tribe and first Diné attorney.
 Peter MacDonald, Navajo Code Talker and former Chairman of the Navajo Tribe.
 Mark Maryboy (Aneth/Red Mesa/Mexican Water), former Navajo Nation Council Delegate, working in Utah Navajo Investments.
 Lilakai Julian Neil, the first woman elected to Navajo Tribal Council.
 Joe Shirley, Jr., former President of the Navajo Nation.
 Ben Shelly, former President of the Navajo Nation.
 Chris Stearns, member of the Washington House of Representatives since 2022.
 Chris Deschene, veteran, attorney, engineer, and a community leader. One of few Native Americans to be accepted into the U.S. Naval Academy in Annapolis. Upon graduation, he was commissioned as a 2nd Lt. in the U.S. Marine Corps. He made an unsuccessful attempt to run for Navajo Nation President.

Writers
 Freddie Bitsoie, author and chef 
 Sherwin Bitsui, author and poet
 Luci Tapahonso, poet and lecturer
 Elizabeth Woody, author, educator, and environmentalist

See also

 Navajo-Churro sheep
 Navajo pueblitos
 Navajo Nation
 Long Walk of the Navajo

Notes

References
Adair, John. The Navajo and Pueblo Silversmiths. Norman: Oklahoma Press, 1989. .
Iverson, Peter, Jennifer Nez Denetdale, and Ada E. Deer. The Navajo. New York: Chelsea House Publishers, 2006. .
 Kehoe, Alice Beck. North American Indians: A Comprehensive account. Upper Saddle River, NJ: Prentice-Hall, 2005.

 Pritzker, Barry M. A Native American Encyclopedia: History, Culture, and Peoples. Oxford: Oxford University Press, 2000. .
 Sandner, Donald. Navaho symbols of healing: a Jungian exploration of ritual, image, and medicine. Rochester, VT: Healing Arts Press, 1991. .
 Sides, Hampton, Blood and Thunder: An Epic of the American West. Doubleday (2006). 

Further reading
 Bailey, L. R. (1964). The Long Walk: A History of the Navaho Wars, 1846–1868.
 Bighorse, Tiana (1990). Bighorse the Warrior. Ed. Noel Bennett, Tucson: University of Arizona Press.

 Clarke, Dwight L. (1961). Stephen Watts Kearny: Soldier of the West. Norman, Oklahoma: University of Oklahoma Press.
 Downs, James F. (1972). The Navajo. New York: Holt, Rinehart, and Winston.
 
 
 Hammond, George P. and Rey, Agapito (editors) (1940). Narratives of the Coronado Expedition 1540–1542. Albuquerque: University of New Mexico Press.
 Iverson, Peter (2002). Diné: A History of the Navahos. Albuquerque: University of New Mexico Press. .
 Kelly, Lawrence (1970). Navajo Roundup Pruett Pub. Co., Colorado.
 Linford, Laurence D. (2000). Navajo Places: History, Legend, Landscape. Salt Lake City: University of Utah Press. 
 McNitt, Frank (1972). Navajo Wars. Albuquerque: University of New Mexico Press.
 Plog, Stephen Ancient Peoples of the American Southwest. Thames and London, LTD, London, England, 1997. .
 Roessel, Ruth (editor) (1973). Navajo Stories of the Long Walk Period. Tsaile, Arizona: Navajo Community College Press.
 
 Voyles, Traci Brynne (2015). Wastelanding: Legacies of Uranium Mining in Navajo Country. Minneapolis, MN: University of Minnesota Press.
 
 Witherspoon, Gary (1977). Language and Art in the Navajo Universe. Ann Arbor: University of Michigan Press.
 Witte, Daniel. Removing Classrooms from the Battlefield: Liberty, Paternalism, and the Redemptive Promise of Educational Choice, 2008 BYU Law Review 377 The Navajo and Richard Henry Pratt
 Zaballos, Nausica (2009). Le système de santé navajo''. Paris: L'Harmattan.

External links

Navajo Nation, official site
Navajo Tourism Department
Navajo people: history, culture, language, art
Middle Ground Project of Northern Colorado University with images of U.S. documents of treaties and reports 1846–1931
Navajo Silversmiths, by Washington Matthews, 1883 from Project Gutenberg
Navajo Institute for Social Justice
Navajo Arts Information on authentic Navajo Art, Rugs, Jewelry, and Crafts
The Navajo Navajo expert, Doctor Sarah Davis, about the Navajo

 
Native American history of Arizona
Native American history of New Mexico
Native American history of Utah
Native American tribes in Arizona
Native American tribes in New Mexico
Native American tribes in Utah